Lentzea kentuckyensis is a bacterium from the genus Lentzea which has been isolated from a placenta of an Equine in Lexington.

References

Pseudonocardiales
Bacteria described in 2007